Bernie Drury (born 8 May 1948) is a former Australian rules footballer who played with Fitzroy in the Victorian Football League (VFL).

Career 
Drury made six senior appearances for Fitzroy in the 1966 VFL season, all in losses.

In 1967, he returned to his original club, Montmorency. Playing as a full-forward, he topped the Diamond Valley Football League goal-kicking that year with 69 goals.

References

1948 births
Australian rules footballers from Victoria (Australia)
Fitzroy Football Club players
Montmorency Football Club players
Living people